Alfred Sit Wing-hang, GBS, JP (born 1962) is a Hong Kong government official. Since 2020, he served as Secretary for Innovation and Technology from 2020 to 2022.

Sit joined the Hong Kong government as an Assistant Electrical and Mechanical Engineer in September 1984 and was promoted to Chief Electrical and Mechanical Engineer in August 2001. He was subsequently promoted to Government Electrical and Mechanical Engineer in December 2007 and to Deputy Director of Electrical and Mechanical Services in September 2011. He rose to Director of Electrical and Mechanical Services in October 2017.

Sit was president of the Hong Kong Institute of Facility Management, the chairman of the Biomedical Division, and the honorary secretary of the Nuclear Division of the Hong Kong Institution of Engineers.

In April 2020, Chief Executive Carrie Lam appointed him Secretary for Innovation and Technology, succeeding Nicholas Yang.

References

1962 births
Living people
Hong Kong civil servants
Government officials of Hong Kong
Members of the Executive Council of Hong Kong
Hong Kong engineers
Recipients of the Gold Bauhinia Star